Cambridge University Amateur Boxing Club (CUABC) is the boxing club of the University of Cambridge, England. The club was founded in 1896 after the King's College Boxing Club amalgamated with Fordham's School of Arms to form the Cambridge University Boxing & Fencing Club (CUB&FC).

The club has competed against Oxford University Amateur Boxing Club in the Varsity Match each year since 1897 to win the Truelove Bowl. Typically, the match location switches between Oxford and Cambridge, though recently Cambridge have hosted matches in London. Boxers who compete in the Varsity Match are traditionally awarded a Full Blue by the Cambridge University Men's Blues Committee if they win individually or the team wins. Other boxers, such as those having been selected for a second Varsity Match, can be awarded a Blue at the discretion of the committee.

In the 2005 Varsity Match, Kaleen Love of Oxford defeated Catherine Tubb of Cambridge in the first women's varsity boxing bout. Catherine Tubb had previously beaten Kaleen at the BUSA championships held in December 2004. Both were awarded Extraordinary Full Blues for their athletic accomplishments. In recent years, two more Extraordinary Full Blues have been awarded to Sarah Burden and Heley Matthews. Chris Webb remains the only boxer in history to have represented Cambridge in the Varsity match 4 times, and won all 4 bouts.

In both the 2005 and 2009 Varsity Matches, CUABC beat OUABC by the maximum 9-0 margin. Cambridge University Amateur Boxing Club (CUABC) remains the only side to have achieved this feat since the number of bouts was increased to 9 in the 1950s.

On 1 March 2015 CUABC broke OUABC's five year winning streak in the Varsity Match, winning 6-3.

The running total for the Men's Varsity Match is 55-54 in CUABC's favour as of 2020 after a three year winning streak by the Cambridge boxers.

CUABC trains at University of Cambridge Sports Centre.

See also
 Oxford–Cambridge rivalry
 Varsity match

References

External links

Boxing clubs in the United Kingdom
Boxing Club
Boxing in England
1896 establishments in England